The Sikhs raided Delhi 19 times between 1766 and 1788. Sikhs were very scornful towards Delhi due to the following reasons.

 Mughal Emperor Jahangir tortured Guru Arjan Dev to death.
 Guru Hargobind was imprisoned in the fort of Gwalior by Jahangir.
 Guru Tegh Bahadur was executed on the orders of Aurangzeb at Chandi Chowk.
 Guru Gobind Singh suffered a lot at the hands of Delhi. He lost his four sons, two in the Battle of Chamkaur and two were bricked alive by Wazir Khan (Sirhind).
 Banda Singh Bahadur was executed on the orders of Farruksiyar in Delhi.
 Sikhs suffered massacres like Chota Ghalughara and other persecutions in Punjab under the Mughal rulers.

Prelude
In 1764, Sikhs helped Jats of Bharatpur to capture Delhi after the Battle of Delhi (1764).

First Raid
After defeating Mughals in the Battle of Sirhind (1764) Sikhs plundered jagir of Najib-ud-daula. Najib appointed Afzal Khan to take care of Delhi. Sikhs raided the Paharganj region of the city.

Second Raid
Sikhs raided Delhi in 1770. They sacked Panipat and entered the territories of Najib-ud-daula and attacked Delhi. Zabita Khan was sent to stop Sikhs The Sikhs demanded a large amount of money for friendship but declined by Zabita.

Third Raid
In 1770, Najib-ud-daula passed away and Zabita Khan took the chief of Rohilla. The Sikhs again came to Delhi and attacks Zabita Khan's territory. Details of Sikh invasion have been noted by French Missionary, Father Peere.

Sikhs Defeated Mughals
Nasir ul Mulk was the third son of Nizam-ul-Mulk, Asaf Jah I of Hyderabad State was disappointed by his brother's so he came to Delhi. In 1772, he was appointed as the Governor of Sirhind. He had an army of 19,000 soldiers of Mughals, Afghans and Marathas. At the Battle of Kunjpura (1772), he was attacked by Sikh sardars Sahib Singh, Dyal Singh and Laja Singh with 6,000 soldiers. 500 men lost on both sides. Nasir ul Mulk along with Daler Khan went to the fort but Sikhs besieged fort for 13 days. On 14th day, the Mughals were defeated.

Fourth Raid
On 18 January 1774, the Sikhs invaded Delhi for the fourth time. They plundered Shahdara and the Mughal nobility.

Fifth Raid
In October of 1774 the Sikhs raided and ravaged Delhi.

Sixth Raid
One 15 July 1775, the Sikhs raided and set fire to Paharganj and Jaisinghpur . Mughals failed to stop the Sikh advances.

Seventh Raid
The seventh raid happened in November of 1776. The Prime Minister of the Mughal empire, Najaf Khan, was taken by surprise.

Eighth Raid
The eighth raid happened in September of 1778. Sahib Singh encamped near the Shalimar garden. The Mughals invited the Sikhs to a feast.

Ninth Raid
On 1 October of 1778 , which was Dushera day the Sikh attacked Delhi and all the way to Rakabganj. They destroyed a Mosque which was created on the site of a previously destroyed Gurdwara. The Sikh remainded in Delhi for one month after capture.

Tenth Raid
On the 12th of April 1781 after attacks by the Mughals to the Sikh the Sikh marched toward Delhi. The sacked Baghpat and laid waste to Khekra. The Sikhs managed to intercept letters of Najaf Khan, thus an alarm was raised in Delhi. On the 13th they stormed Sardhana and Mawana. They pillaged Muradnagar. Manu Lal, the vaki of Begam Samru, sought immediate aid. Najaf Khan ordered Afrasiyab Khan to march on the Sikh but they refused unless they were paid. Najaf had no money.

On the 16th the Sikh attacked Patparganj and Shahdara which were the suburbs of Delhi. People over 50 miles South of Delhi were terrified. Other Sikh armies conquered Sheikhpura and Barnawa. The amil of the place was wounded and fled. On the 17th Najaf Khan marched to Karinana to protect his own estate.  Najaf Khan amrched woth many generals against the Sikh as they continued to conquer the area around Delhi. Murtaza Khan and Gazi Khan had 4,100 troops ready to march against the Sikh.

On the 20th the Sikh crossed the Yamuna back into their own territory and started selling looted propery and goods. On the 24th 500 more Sikh crossed the river with 300 of the carrying booty. A skirmish occurred when Mir Mansu attacked the Sikh eventually dying in batlle.

Eleventh Raid
On March 28th, 1782 Najaf Khan ordered Shafi to march against the Sikh with an army of 10,00. Najaf Khan would die soon after giving the orders. Shafi attacked the Sikh for two months before being summoned in Delhi and making negotiations with the Sikhs. As September began and the rainy season over the Sikh raided and looted everything from Delhi to Hardwar.

Twelfth Raid
In 1783, a body of 40,000 Sikhs camped at Delhi. Prince Mirza Shikoh was defeated and fled. The Sikh soldiers were divided into 3 groups. Two groups of 5,000 Sikhs each deployed at Majnu-ka-Tilla and Ajmeri Gate whereas 30,000 Sikhs under Baghel Singh camped at a place known as Tees Hazari before attacking Red Fort. The Sikhs defeated the Mughals in the Battle of Delhi (1783) and captured Delhi. Jassa Singh Ahluwalia was placed on the takht of Delhi as Badshah Singh of Delhi but Jassa Singh Ramgarhia objected that without Dal Khalsa meeting no one can be placed on the throne. Mughals agreed to construct 7 Sikh Gurudwaras in Delhi for Sikh Gurus.

Gurudwaras
 Gurdwara Mata Sundri
 Gurdwara Bangla Sahib
 Gurdwara Rakab Ganj
 Gurdwara Sis Ganj
 Gurdwara Majnu Ka Tilla

Photo of Mughal Slab
Mughal slab from Delhi was roped with horse and brought to Amritsar in Punjab

Thirteenth Raid

In December 1784 the Sikh raided and plundered the neighbourhoods of Delhi on instigation of Najaf Quli Khan. The Sikh quickly retreated before any counterattack.

Fourteenth Raid
In January 1786 the Sikh and Gujars raided the territory from Panipat to Delhi. Sikh numbering near 5,000 had plundered villages near Ghausgarh. The Sikh further ravaged Meerut, Harpar, and Gharmuktesar. Ravjoli Sindha marched to the Sikh with 7,000 calvary and 10 cannons. The Sikh marched back to their own territory.

Fifteenth Raid
On the 27th of July, 1787 500 Sikhs plundered everything from Agra to Delhi.

Sixteenth Raid 
The sixteenth raid happened in August of 1787. The Sikh once more attacked Shahdara. The Sikh fought with the imperial guards and defeated them. Martha General Madho Rao Phalke. In the fight many men drowned in the river with a large number being killed or wounded. Shah Nizum-ud-Din and Deshmukh watched the violence and decided to join in. They attacked the Sikh with many bullets but retreated later on. Phalke surrendered while the rest of the generals fled.

Seventeenth Raid
The Sikh with Ghaulam Qadir attacked the Red Fort on October 30th, 1787.

Eighteenth Raid
In early 1788 Ghulam Qadir’s territory was unprotected. The Sikh attacked the territory which included Delhi.

Nineteenth Raid
One the night of March 12, 1788 the Sikh with Najaf Quli Khan attacked the tent of the emperor and slaughtered his men. The emperor managed to save himself by feeling to a heavily guarded tent.

References

History of Sikhism
History of Delhi